High Knob is a mountain in Schoharie County, New York. It is located southwest of Livingstonville. Steenburg Mountain is located southeast and Scott Patent Hill is located east-northeast of High Knob.

References

Mountains of Schoharie County, New York
Mountains of New York (state)